GPS is the Global Positioning System, a satellite-based navigation system.

GPS may also refer to:

Technology
 GPS navigation device, especially an automotive navigation system
 Generalized processor sharing, an algorithm to fairly share computer processing time
 General Problem Solver, a 1959 computer program
 GNAT Programming Studio, a software development package
 Satellite navigation, GPS (global positioning system) in common parlance

Organizations
 Crossroads GPS (Grassroots Policy Strategies), a nonprofit corporation that works in conjunction with the Super PAC American Crossroads
 Fusion GPS, American commercial and strategic research firm
 Gap Inc. stock ticker
 Ghana Prisons Service
 GPS (band), a progressive rock band
 GPS Rugby, an Australian rugby union club
 Geirus Policies and Standards committee, a body of the Rabbinical Council of America
 Gabungan Parti Sarawak, a Malaysian political coalition based in Sarawak

Education
 Gilbert Public Schools, a school district in Gilbert, Arizona, US
 Girls Preparatory School, an all-girls prep school in Chattanooga, Tennessee, US
 Athletic Association of the Great Public Schools of New South Wales, an association of private boys' schools, Australia
 Great Public Schools Association of Queensland Inc., an association of nine Australian schools
 Grosse Pointe South High School, a public high school in Grosse Pointe, Michigan, US
 Greenville Public Schools (a.k.a. Greenville Public School District), a school district in Greenville, Mississippi, US
 The School of Global Policy and Strategy, an institute of international studies at the University of California, San Diego

Medicine
 Goodpasture syndrome, a rare autoimmune disease
 Gray platelet syndrome, a rare congenital autosomal recessive bleeding disorder

Other uses
 Seymour Airport (IATA code), Galápagos Islands, Ecuador
 Fareed Zakaria GPS (Global Public Square), a CNN television show
 Geometrical Products Specification, an international standard for geometric dimensioning and tolerancing
 Genealogical Proof Standard (see also Cluster genealogy)
 "GPS" (song), a song by Maluma
 "Var är jag", renamed to "GPS", a song by Basshunter from his LOL <(^^,)> album

See also
 Grams of protein per dollar (gP/$), a means of representing the cost of amino acids in a food product